Willy Signori e vengo da lontano is a 1989 Italian romantic comedy film directed by Francesco Nuti.

For his performance Alessandro Haber won the Nastro d'Argento for best supporting actor.

Plot 
Willy Signori is a journalist in Milan, bored with his work, involved in a romantic relationship that has no more romance left, only routine, and a paraplegic brother under his care, constantly asking to "move to Africa where the warm climate will help my poor legs". One night, Willy is involved in a car crash, accidentally killing the other car's driver. The following day Lucia, the victim's girlfriends, angrily confronts Willy in his office, accusing him of being a murderer. Willy keeps his cool and tries to financially and morally support Lucia to recover from her shock, as he feels guilty because she is pregnant from the dead boyfriend. Willy tries to support her behind his fiancée's back, and in due time between the two there are sparks of love. After a quarrel, and after breaking up from his relationship, Willy leaves for Africa with his brother for holiday, and there, we see Lucia giving birth in an African clinic, to a baby who most likely will know Willy as his father.

Cast 
Francesco Nuti as Willy Signori
Isabella Ferrari as Lucia Ventura
Anna Galiena as Alessandra
Alessandro Haber as Ugo Signori
Novello Novelli as the corpse
Antonio Petrocelli as the gynaecologist
Cristina Gaioni as Ilona
Fabrizio Galasso as traffic warden
Giovanni Veronesi as the window cleaner
Don Powell as an African doctor

Reception
It was one of the highest-grossing Italian films of the year.

References

External links

1989 films
Italian romantic comedy films
Films directed by Francesco Nuti
1989 romantic comedy films
Films about journalists
Films set in Milan
1980s Italian films